The Islamic Development Bank (abbreviated as IsDB) is a multilateral development finance institution that is focused on Islamic finance for infrastructure development and located in Jeddah, Saudi Arabia. There are 57 shareholding member states with the largest single shareholder being Saudi Arabia.

History
It was founded in 1973 by the Finance Ministers at the first Organisation of the Islamic Conference (now called the Organisation of Islamic Cooperation) with the support of the King of Saudi Arabia at the time (Faisal), and began its activities on 3 April 1975.

On the 22 May 2013, IDB tripled its authorized capital to $150 billion to better serve Muslims in member and non-member countries. The Bank has received credit ratings of AAA from Standard & Poor's, Moody's, and Fitch. Saudi Arabia holds about one quarter of the bank's paid up capital. The IDB is an observer at the United Nations General Assembly.

Membership 
The present membership of the Bank consists of 57 countries. The basic condition for membership is that the prospective member country should be a member of the Organisation of Islamic Cooperation (OIC), pay its contribution to the capital of the Bank and be willing to accept such terms and conditions as may be decided upon by the IDB Board of Governors.

Ranked on the basis of paid-up capital (as of August 2015), major shareholders include:
 Saudi Arabia (26.57%)
 Algeria (10.66%)
 Iran (9.32%)
 Egypt (9.22%)
 Turkey (8.41%)
 United Arab Emirates (7.54%)
 Kuwait (7.11%)
 Pakistan (3.31%)
 Libya (3.31%)
 Indonesia (2.93%)

Structure 

IDB has evolved into a group of five entities, consisting of Islamic Development Bank (IDB), Islamic Research & Training Institute (IRTI), Islamic Corporation for Development of the Private Sector (ICD), Islamic Corporation for Insurance of Investment and Export Credit (ICIEC) and International Islamic Trade Finance Corporation (ITFC).

Activities 
IDB Group is engaged in a wide range of specialized and integrated activities such as:

 Project financing in the public and private sectors;
 Development assistance for poverty alleviation;
 Technical assistance for capacity-building;
 Economic and trade cooperation among member countries;
 Trade financing;
 SME financing;
 Resource mobilization;
 Direct equity investment in Islamic financial institutions;
 Insurance and reinsurance coverage for investment and export credit;
 Research and training programs in Islamic economics and banking;
 Awqaf investment and financing;
 Special assistance and scholarships for member countries and Muslim communities in non-member countries;
 Emergency relief; and
 Advisory services for public and private entities in member countries.

Projects and programs 

The Gao Bridge in Mali: Until a few years ago, crossing the Niger River at Gao was done by a ferry that might or might not be operating. This hindered progress and discouraged trade. The Gao Bridge financed by the IDB connected the once isolated Gao Region in eastern Mali to the heartland.

Criticism 

Dr. Ali had previously declared that IDB was in charge of the financing of al-Quds Intifada Fund and al-Aqsa Fund, both established during an Arab summit in Cairo in October 2000. According to the final communiqué of the summit, "Al-Quds Intifada Fund will have capital of 200 million dollars to be allocated for disbursement to the families of Palestinian martyrs fallen in the Intifada."

According to a US State Department cable sent in 2007 and later released by Wikileaks, a State Department investigation found no "evidence sufficient to corroborate Israeli and press allegations of IDB links to terrorism". However, according to NGO Monitor, a pro-Israeli NGO based in Jerusalem, the Islamic Development Bank is a major contributor to Islamic Relief Worldwide, an organization considered by some to support terrorism and extremism. For example, the United Arab Emirates listed Islamic Relief Worldwide as a terrorist organization in 2014. However, the British government undertook a national investigation into the matter at the request of the UAE government and the final report cleared the international charity. Neither the Islamic Development Bank nor the Islamic Relief Worldwide organization has ever been designated a terrorist entity or as an organization funding terrorism by the UN or the US government.

See also 

 Economy of the Organisation of Islamic Cooperation
 Asian Development Bank
 Asian Infrastructure Investment Bank
 European Bank for Reconstruction and Development
 African Development Bank
 Caribbean Development Bank
 CAF – Development Bank of Latin America
 European Investment Bank
 Inter-American Development Bank
 International Islamic Trade Finance Corporation
 Islamic banking
 Islamic Organisation for Food Security

References

External links 
 IDB Review by DinarStandard

Organisation of Islamic Cooperation specialized agencies
1975 establishments in Saudi Arabia
Banks established in 1975
Companies based in Jeddah
International banking institutions
International organizations based in the Middle East
Multilateral development banks
United Nations General Assembly observers
Islamic banks of Saudi Arabia